Anthemoctena is a monotypic moth genus in the family Geometridae. Its only species, Anthemoctena lineata, is found in South Africa. Both the genus and species were described by Warren in 1895.

References

Sterrhinae
Geometridae genera
Monotypic moth genera